Tarazona Cathedral (Catedral de Nuestra Señora de la Huerta de Tarazona, originally Iglesia de Nuestra Señora de la Hidria or Nuestra Señora de la Huerta o de la Vega) is a Roman Catholic church located in Tarazona, Zaragoza province, in Aragon, Spain. The cathedral's architecture is representative of the Gothic and Mudéjar style, and is one of the few remaining examples of this type of architecture, along with Teruel Cathedral.

History
Construction on this cathedral first began in the 12th century in the French Gothic style, and it was consecrated in 1232.

The cathedral was located outside of the city walls, which was unusual, and may have been caused by the fact that there was an ancient Mozarabic church on the site which had been located outside of the formerly Moorish city.

In the fourteenth century, being outside of the city walls, it was assaulted and destroyed during the War of the Two Peters.  Its naves were then rebuilt with Mudéjar decorations, as well as its lateral chapels, exterior walls, dome (cimborio), and tower.  The tower was rebuilt in the fifteenth century.

The monastery at Veruela was built nearby in Gothic style.

In 1984, a major restoration of the cathedral was begun. In February 2012, Prince Felipe and Princess Letizia marked the completion of the restoration, with the President of Aragon, Luisa Fernanda Rudi, and the Bishop of Tarazona.

See also
Catholic Church in Spain
Diocese of Tarazona
List of Bienes de Interés Cultural in the Province of Zaragoza
Mudéjar Architecture of Aragon — World Heritage Site.
History of medieval Arabic and Western European domes

Notes

External links 
 Turiaso website
 Arteguias website

Photo gallery 

Tarazona
Churches in Aragon
Roman Catholic cathedrals in Aragon
Gothic architecture in Aragon
Mudéjar architecture in Aragon
Romanesque architecture in Aragon
13th-century Roman Catholic church buildings in Spain
Churches completed in 1232
Bien de Interés Cultural landmarks in the Province of Zaragoza
World Heritage Sites in Spain